is a Japanese comedy romance shōjo manga series written and illustrated by Rin Mikimoto. It was adapted into a Japanese television drama that aired on Nippon Television from July 19 to October 11, 2014 and into a live action film that was released on October 11, 2014, in Japan.

Characters
 Haruka Sakurai (Tomohisa Yamashita)
 Yuni Kururugi (Nana Komatsu)
 Ikuhaba (Nozomu Kotaki)
 Kikuko Nanami (Mizuki Yamamoto)
 Mirei Takizawa (Asami Mizukawa)
 Akachi (Hirofumi Arai)

Film adaptation

A film adaptation was released in 2014. The film has been number one at the Japanese box office for two weeks and has grossed ¥475 million.

See also
Kyō no Kira-kun, another manga series by the same author

References

External links
Television drama official website 

Shōjo manga
Kodansha manga
Manga adapted into films
2014 Japanese television series debuts
2014 Japanese television series endings
Nippon TV dramas
Comedy anime and manga
Romance anime and manga
Manga adapted into television series
2010s Japanese films